Caesar Edward Belser (September 13, 1944 – March 5, 2016) was an American football linebacker and safety who played in the American Football League (AFL) and the National Football League (NFL). He is the father of Jason Belser.

He played college football at the Arkansas AM&N, and professionally in the AFL and the NFL for the Kansas City Chiefs and later the San Francisco 49ers.

Belser died on the weekend of March 5, 2016, according to his family. He was 71. He was battling lung cancer, as well as neurological damage from playing football. Per his family's wishes, his brain will be donated to scientific research.

See also
List of American Football League players

References

External links
NFL.com player page

1944 births
2016 deaths
American football linebackers
American football safeties
Arkansas–Pine Bluff Golden Lions football players
Edmonton Elks players
Kansas City Chiefs players
San Francisco 49ers players
Players of American football from Montgomery, Alabama
American Football League players
Deaths from lung cancer in Texas